Gerano is a  (municipality) in the Metropolitan City of Rome in the Italian region of Latium, located about  east of Rome.

History 
The year of foundation of Gerano is unknown; however, it is known that in 1005 it constituted a castrum. In the Middle Ages, due to its strategic and economic importance, as the capital of Massa Giovenzana (replacing the more ancient Trellanum), for a while, Pope Gregory VII was interested in it, who in 1077 confirmed Gerano to be divided between the diocese of Tivoli and the abbot of Subiaco.

References

External links
 Official website

Cities and towns in Lazio